Railroad police or railway police are people responsible for the protection of railroad (or railway) properties, facilities, revenue, equipment (train cars and locomotives), and personnel, as well as carried passengers and cargo. Railroad police may also patrol public rail transit systems. Their exact roles differs from country to country. In some countries, railroad police are no different from any other police agency, while in others they are more like security police. Some are given extensive additional authority, while those in other jurisdictions are more restricted.

In the United States and Canada, railroad police are employed by the major Class I railroads, as well as some smaller ones. In other countries, this work is typically done by territorial police forces rather than specialized agencies. In the United Kingdom, railways fall under the jurisdiction of the British Transport Police, a national transit police force that is responsible for policing all railways and some public transit systems in the Britain.

Brazil

The Brazilian's Federal Railroad Police was created in 1852 by decree of the emperor Dom Pedro II, making it the oldest police agency in Brazil. There are some proposals in the Brazilian Senate to reactivate this police agency, as it is considered important to national security.

Canada

Canadian railways, like those of the United States, aided in nation-building and brought new police agencies into existence. Railway constables are given full police powers within 500 meters of property that the railway company owns, possesses or administers. The Canadian Pacific Railway initially relied on the Dominion Police, and later the North-West Mounted Police during construction of the transcontinental railroad, but by the later 1880s were employing their own police.

The large numbers of navvies recruited to build the railways brought security problems for rail companies. In 1900, the CPR established its Special Service Department. It worked closely with municipal, federal, and provincial police and given a mandate to prevent and investigate pilferage, theft, vandalism, and sabotage as well as policing strikes. The CPR Special Service were also responsible for closely guarding Chinese workers, who were considered "detainees" and virtually treated as prisoners under the Chinese Immigration Act of 1885. The Special Service was dissolved in 1904, following a scandal involving the business practices of a CPR Labour Department agent in Montreal, but was resurrected in 1913 as the railway's Department of Investigation.

The Canadian Pacific Police Service, Canadian National Police Service, and VIA Rail Canada Police Service are the only federal railway police services operating in Canada. Police officers for the railways are federally sworn under the Railway Safety Act.  This act allows a superior court (federal) judge to appoint a person as a police constable. These officers are employed by the railway and are in place strategically within Canada's rail infrastructure with a primary focus on reducing deaths and injuries along each railway's network of operations. These officers typically work on investigations involving criminal and provincial violations, such as traffic enforcement and accident investigations, and working to educate the public about the dangers of rail operations and consequences that can result from complacency.

These police officers are also appointed or sworn provincially to provide additional police powers as it relates to each province's interest. The primary jurisdictional police are still responsible for all law enforcement in their jurisdiction, and due to reduced manpower and coverage the railway police are considered a secondary response agency. Often the primary jurisdictional police are required to deal with matters that occur on or in relation to railway property. Depending on the seriousness of the incident, railway police may assume jurisdiction, though due to their reduced numbers and capabilities they may require local police to assume control over an incident and act in a supporting role. Railway police also support local police at incidents not in relation to the railway.

Transit police

People's Republic of China

The governing body of almost all railroad operations—the Chinese Ministry of Railways, which was also the owner of a great deal of the country's rail network—operated a massive police force that provided security service inside major railroad hubs and stations and outside along the railroads. Their jurisdiction extends to the limit of MoR property, yet occasionally the jurisdiction overlaps with local forces, in case it was an offence that occurred inside MoR facility, or related to MoR operations.

The railroad police of PRC can be considered as the only civil police force under the command of an agency of central government, more precisely the MoR. Its branches distribute in parallel to the railway bureaus of MoR, and for a period of time, it was considered its subsidiary, since the "railway bureau" is an entity of mixed nature: as a government agency as well as a corporation. Consequently, some railroad police agency will cover several regions of operation on a provincial level. For example, the division level Tianjin railroad police force will answer to the prefecture level Beijing railroad police bureau, despite the fact that regular police force of Tianjin is collateral to its Beijing equivalence. While supervised by the Ministry of Public Security, the force was funded exclusively by MoR itself, therefore often was criticized for protecting corporate interest under MoR. Since it is prevalent in PRC that local police force was conscripted as a private army of individuals, such criticism actually reflects the dispute between local and central government at some level.

Germany
Bahnschutzpolizei was the railroad police of Nazi Germany. It was tasked with railway safety and also with preventing espionage and sabotage of railway property. It was not subordinated to Hauptamt Ordnungspolizei, only the Deutsche Reichsbahn.

Bahnpolizei was the name of the former Railway police of West Germany and fell under the jurisdiction of the Deutsche Bundesbahn federal railway company. Bahnpolizei officers investigated trespassing on rail property, assaults against passengers, terrorism threats targeting the railway, arson, tagging of graffiti on railroad rolling stock or buildings, signal vandalism, pickpocketing, ticket fraud, robbery, and theft of personal belongings, baggage, or freight. They also investigated train/vehicle collisions and hazardous materials releases.

In 1992 the railway security mission was transferred to the Bundesgrenzschutz which resulted in the merger of the Bahnpolizei into the Federal Border Guard Force. The BGS had already taken on these duties in 1990 for the territory of the former East Germany, replacing the former East German Transportpolizei. The Bundesgrenzschutz was then renamed the Bundespolizei (Federal Police) on July 1, 2005, and this force is currently responsible for security and passenger checks on the German railway system.

India

The protection of Indian Railways is carried out by the Railway Protection Force and the Government Railway Police.
The Mission of the Railway Protection Force includes to protect and safeguard railway passengers, passenger area and railway property
and also to ensure the safety, security and boost the confidence of the traveling public in the Indian Railways.

Indonesia
Polsuska (Indonesian: Polisi Khusus Kereta Api or Railroad Special Police) is a law enforcement unit under the auspices of the Indonesian Railway Company. Polsuska in its role as a special railroad police is tasked to: apply sanctions in accordance with legislation and implement security, prevention of crime, and prevent non-justice actions within the scope of the Indonesian railways as a partner of the national police. Polsuska has the responsibilities relating to law and order including security of railway stations and train users. Polsuska officers wear black as their uniform and wear orange berets pulled to the left. Polsuska is trained by but not part of the Indonesian National Police. Polsuska is under the command of the Indonesian Railway Company's Directorate of Safety and Security.

The Commuter Lines which serve Greater Jakarta maintains its own security force which are categorized as security guards, their uniform are light-brown and wear orange vest and are known as (Petugas Keamanan Dalam /PKD). These are not part of Polsuska.

Every railway station in Indonesia also operates several security guards to assist Polsuska in the field of law and order including security. During peak seasons such as during the last days of Ramadan and other national holidays, Polsuska may be assisted by members from the military and police to provide additional security presence within the Indonesian Railways.

Italy
Policing of Italian State Railways (Ferrovie dello Stato) is carried out by the Polizia Ferroviaria, a branch of Italy's national police force (Polizia di Stato) operating under the authority of the Minister of the Interior.

Pakistan
In Pakistan protection of Pakistan Railways is carried out by Pakistan Railways Police which comes under Ministry of Railways.

Russia
The MVD Transport Department protects the rail system in Russia. The police is part of the Ministry of Internal Affairs and is responsible for protecting the railway, checking train quality, and maintaining railway safety in the Russian Federation.

Switzerland
Switzerland never had a separate transport police because all rail employees had limited police authority. However, due to the introduction of trains with no conductors in the late 1990s, crime in trains increased and the Swiss Federal Railways rail company trained Bahnpolizei officers for its driver-only commuter trains.

In 2002 the SBB-CFF-FFS merged its Bahnpolizei force with the private security company Securitas AG and the resulting Securitrans is now a separate security agency protecting railroad infrastructures.

Since 2011, the rail police has been reorganised, and the Transport Police of Switzerland (Transportpolizei) are state employees, with all officers attending two years of police academy training with final certification.

Transportpolizei officers are sworn as officers to the Swiss Confederation, and thus have the same power to arrest as any other cantonal police officers. As their state counterparts, they usually carry a SIG Sauer P225 and pepper sprays as weapons, along with handcuffs for restrain options.

United Kingdom
The British Transport Police protects the rail system in Great Britain, due to the nationalisation of the railways in 1948. Prior to this, individual railways had their own police forces.

United States

History

The history of railroad police in the United States traces back to the beginnings of the Pinkerton National Detective Agency. In the mid nineteenth century, the number of U.S. Marshals was insufficient to police the railway lines sprawling across the vast frontier.

Passing through areas far removed from the protective measures available in populated centers left railroad lines and their passengers and freight vulnerable to banditry. Through his detective business, Allan Pinkerton met George B. McClellan, the president of the Ohio and Mississippi Railroad and Illinois Central Railroad, as well as its attorney, Abraham Lincoln. With Lincoln's encouragement, Pinkerton began supplying detectives for the railroad.

Railroad contracts were subsequently a mainstay of Pinkerton's until railroad companies gradually developed their own police departments in the years following the Civil War. After the founding of the Brotherhood of Locomotive Engineers in 1863, Pinkerton's and the new railroad police agencies became instrumental in crushing strikes of rail workers.

Another major concern was pilferage by employees, especially the passenger conductor, who had the greatest authority and freedom on passenger trains and collected ticket fees. Pinkerton began this work for the South Michigan Line in 1854, and on 1 February 1855, he created the North West Police Agency with $10,000 given for the cause by six anxious Midwestern railroads.

Jurisdiction and authority
Some railroad police officers are certified law enforcement officers and may carry full police and arrest powers. The appointment, commissioning, and regulation of railroad police under Section 1704 of the U.S. Crime Control Act of 1990, provides that: "A railroad police officer who is certified or commissioned as a police officer under the laws of any one state shall, in accordance with the regulations issued by the U.S. Secretary of Transportation, be authorized to enforce the laws of any other state in which the rail carrier owns property."

It is important to note that Section 1704 also states that this police authority is to "the extent of the authority of a police officer certified or commissioned under the laws of that jurisdiction". While railroad police officers may have general peace officer authority in some states such as California, they are limited to the railroad's property in other states.

The status of railroad police officers varies by state, in that they are commissioned by the governor of the state in which they reside and/or work in and they may carry both state level arrest powers and some interstate arrest powers as allowed by 49 USC 28101. Although railroad police primarily enforce laws on or near the railroad right-of-way, their police officers can enforce other laws and make arrests off of railroad property depending on the state in which they are working.

Depending upon the state or jurisdiction, railroad police officers may be considered certified police officers, deputized peace officers, or company special agents. In Virginia, for example, any railroad may file an application with the circuit court of any county where it operates to allow the president of the railroad to appoint members of its own police force.

Some of the crimes railroad police investigate include trespassing on the right-of-way of a railroad, assaults against passengers, terrorism threats targeting the railroad, arson, tagging of graffiti on railroad rolling stock or buildings, signal vandalism, pickpocketing, ticket fraud, robbery, and theft of personal belongings, baggage, or freight. Other incidents railroad police investigate include derailments, train/vehicle collisions, vehicle accidents on the right of way, and hazardous materials releases.

Joint Terrorism Task Force
Most railroad police agencies are participants in the FBI's Joint Terrorism Task Force.

Railroad police agencies

Private railroad agencies
Private railroad police officers are deputized by individual states. For example, in Massachusetts, railroad and ferry company employees may be appointed as special Massachusetts State Police officers with jurisdiction on company property and vehicles. Federal regulations extend the authority granted by one state to a railroad police officer to all the states in which that railroad has property.

Class I:
BNSF Police Department
Canadian National Police
Canadian Pacific Police Service
CSX Transportation Police Department
Kansas City Southern Railway Police
Norfolk Southern Railway Police Department
Union Pacific Police Department

Class II and III:
AG Valley Railroad Police (Chicago, Illinois)
Alaska Railroad Corporation Police Department (Alaska)
Boston and Maine Railroad Police Department (subsidiary of Pan Am Railways; also covers ex-Maine Central territory owned by PAR) (Massachusetts and Maine)
Florida East Coast Railway Police (Florida)
Indiana Harbor Belt Railroad Police (Indiana)
Morristown & Erie Railway Police (New Jersey)
Napa Valley Railroad Police (Napa Valley, California)
Pacific Harbor Line Railroad Police (California)
Port Terminal Railroad Association Police (Texas)
Seminole Gulf Railway Police (Florida)
R.J. Corman Railroad Police Department (Kentucky)
Terminal Railroad Association of St. Louis Railroad Police (St. Louis, Missouri)

Public rail transit police agencies

The Amtrak Police Department has its own authority under federal law; others listed here are created by state authority (possibly delegated to local governments).

Amtrak Police Department (nationwide)
BART Police (San Francisco Bay Area, California)
DART Transit Police (Dallas–Fort Worth metroplex, Texas)
Massachusetts Bay Transportation Authority Police (Massachusetts)
MARTA Police (Atlanta metropolitan area, Georgia)
Metra Police Department (Chicago area, Illinois)
Metro Transit Police Department (Washington DC, Maryland, Virginia)
Metropolitan Transit Police (Minnesota) 
Metropolitan Transportation Authority Police Department (New York State)
New Jersey Transit Police Department (New Jersey)
Northern Indiana Commuter Transportation Department Police (NICTD Police) (Indiana) 
Greater Cleveland Regional Transit Authority Police (RTA Police) (Cuyahoga County, Ohio) 
SEPTA Transit Police (Pennsylvania)
Utah Transit Authority Police Department (Utah)

Vietnam
Department of Traffic Police, part of Ministry of Public Security, includes a Bureau of Instructing and Organizing Safety of Railway. The Bureau is responsible for protecting the railway, checking train quality and maintaining railway safety.

See also
Auxiliary police
Company police
Railroad Guards (Poland)
Security police
Special police

References

 
Defunct law enforcement agencies of Germany
Law enforcement in Switzerland
Law enforcement units
Police units of Germany
Railway occupations